Polyporus phyllostachydis is a fungus species belonging to the genus Polyporus. It is a species known from Japan to grow on the ground on the living or dead roots of the Phyllostachys edulis bamboo.

References

phyllostachydis
Fungi of Japan